Meet Cute is a 2022 American romantic comedy film directed by Alex Lehmann, starring Kaley Cuoco and Pete Davidson. It was digitally released on September 21, 2022, on Peacock, and received mixed reviews from critics.

Plot
Manhattan resident Sheila runs into Gary, a meek man who prefers to watch movies over sports, one night at a bar. They go on a date and bond over their similar taste in drinks and childhoods before the night ends. Throughout the date, Sheila tells him that she discovered June's time machine at a nail salon and has been using it to relive the same night for the past seven nights. They end the date on good terms and she tells him that she'll see him again the next day.

Over the course of a month's worth of resets, Sheila reveals that she began using time travel on the day she planned to kill herself. During the first reset, she and Gary met in a bar and had a nice date. Having felt happy for the first time in a long time, Sheila continues to reset the day and relive the date. After about five months, standing at the spot where she planned to jump off the Manhattan Bridge, she admits that she's in love with Gary, which unnerves him to the point of leaving the date.

After the 364th reset, the monotony of the same date catches up to Sheila. She decides to use the time machine to spice up their date by going further back and changing Gary. On the first anniversary of the resets, Gary is no longer interested in movies, and is now an assertive and successful businessman. Unfortunately, Sheila reveals that she manipulated his life by taking on the role of "Uncle Charlie", Gary's new childhood neighbor who played catch with him and got him interested in sports, as well as "deleting" a couple of negative people in Gary's life. Gary does not take the news kindly and the two end the date on poor terms.

Although Sheila goes back to undo her edits in Gary's life, he experiences déjà vu and manages to piece together that the two have indeed experienced the date multiple times. Upset, Gary uses the knowledge he gained from their date, namely the location of June and the time machine and where Sheila used to live, to try to save Sheila from wanting to commit suicide, which had also made her obsessed with him. While he manages to comfort her as a child, this does not change her life.

Deciding that reliving the same day is no longer making her happy, Sheila goes to commit suicide, which June notices and informs Gary when he comes back from the past. He manages to catch up to Sheila and tells her the machine sent him forward, that she did not commit suicide, and that they met again "tomorrow". He walks away from her. This lie works, and she follows him off the bridge; as the sun rises on tomorrow, the two continue a truly new day for their date.

Cast

 Kaley Cuoco as Sheila
 Pete Davidson as Gary
 Deborah S. Craig as June

In addition, Kevin Corrigan portrays Phil the bartender, Rock Kohli portrays Amit the waiter and Hari Nef portrays Chai the ice cream vendor; all three have extended screen time in the mid-credits montage of scene variations.

Production
In June 2021, it was announced that Kaley Cuoco and Pete Davidson would play the lead roles in a romantic comedy film. It was also announced that the film would be directed by Alex Lehmann. The film's screenplay, written by Noga Pnueli, was featured on the 2018 Black List, which compiles the best unproduced scripts of the year.

The film is produced by Akiva Goldsman, Gregory Lessans, and Rachel Reznick for Weed Road Pictures, and Santosh Govindaraju and Dan Reardon for Convergent Media.

Filming
Principal photography began in August 2021 in New York City. On August 27, 2021, Cuoco announced that filming had wrapped.

Reception
On the review aggregator website Rotten Tomatoes, the film holds an approval rating of 57% based on 28 reviews, with an average rating of 6.1/10. The website's critics consensus reads, "Its charming stars notwithstanding, the middling Meet Cute offers little to set itself apart in the ever-more-crowded 'time loop romcom' subgenre." Metacritic, which uses a weighted average, assigned the film a score of 50 out of 100, based on 12 critics, indicating "mixed or average reviews".

CNN's Brian Lowry characterized the film as a "modest win" for Peacock that ultimately cannot overcome the formula of Groundhog Day-style films.

References

External links
 

2022 romantic comedy films
2020s American films
2020s English-language films
American romantic comedy films
Films produced by Akiva Goldsman
Films set in Manhattan
Films shot in New York City
Peacock (streaming service) original films
Time loop films